Sa Re Ga Ma may refer to any of the following - 

the initial four notes of the standard octave in Indian classical music, see swara
Sa Re Ga Ma, a music record company from India, formerly known as HMV
a Zee TV singing contest show, later known as Sa Re Ga Ma Pa